Constituency NA-205 (Larkana-II) was a constituency for the National Assembly of Pakistan. It was abolished in the 2018 delimitation after the overlap between the constituencies of Larkana District and Qambar Shahdadkot District was undone. Now the two districts have separate constituencies: NA-200 (Larkana-I), NA-201 (Larkana-II), NA-202 (Qambar Shahdadkot-I), and NA-203 (Qambar Shahdadkot-II). And the area of the former NA-205 is divided between NA-201 and NA-203.

Election 2002 

General elections were held on 10 Oct 2002. Hizbullah Bughio of PPP won by 45,097 votes.

Election 2008 

General elections were held on 18 Feb 2008. Nazir Ahmed Bughio of PPP won by 72,928 votes.

Election 2013 

General elections were held on 11 May 2013. Nazir Ahmed Bughio of PPP won by 65,720 votes and became the  member of National Assembly.

References

External links 
Election result's official website

NA-205
Abolished National Assembly Constituencies of Pakistan